Shop Smart Save Money is a British topical series broadcast on Channel 5. Each week the series delivers the latest deals, offers, tips and tricks to make sure that each week "British shoppers are getting the very best value for money." It is presented by Gaby Roslin and Alexis Conran.

Production 
Shop Smart: Save Money is produced by True North Productions.  The programme debuted on Channel 5 in June 2018.

The programme is presented by Gaby Roslin and Alexis Conran. Also in the programme is Andy Webb as the "Deal Detective".

Episodes

Series 1

References

External links 
 

2018 British television series debuts
2010s British reality television series
Channel 5 (British TV channel) reality television shows
English-language television shows
Television shows set in the United Kingdom